Ahmad is a crater in the northern hemisphere of Saturn's moon Enceladus.  Ahmad was first discovered in Voyager 2 images but was seen at much higher resolution, though near the terminator, by Cassini.  It is located at 58.8° North Latitude, 311.6° West Longitude and is 18.7 kilometers across.  The western portion of the crater is largely absent, either buried or disrupted by the eastern margin of Samarkand Sulci.  A large, dome-like structure occupies the interior of the crater, caused by infill of material from Samarkand Sulci or from viscous relaxation.

Ahmad is named after a hero from Arabian Nights.  He brings his father an apple and marries Peri-Banu.

References

Impact craters on Enceladus